Farid Abbasov, (born January 31, 1979) is a chess Grandmaster (2007) from Azerbaijan. He is ranked 14th in Azerbaijan as of July 2021.

In 1997, he took 2nd place in the European Youth Chess Championship.

In 2001, he was awarded the International Master title.

Best results: 1st at Alushta 2004; 1st at Kireyevsk 2004; 2nd at Tula 2006; 1st at Konya 2006; 1st the Rohde Open in Sautron, France 2007; 1st at Çanakkale 2007; 1st at La Fère Open (France) 2008; 1st at Nîmes Open (France) 2008; 2nd at the President's Cup in Baku 2008; 1st at the Caspian Cup in Rasht 2010.

In 2007, he won the gold medal at an international tournament in Laholm, Sweden. Thieves broke into his hotel room and stole his laptop computer, flight ticket, and documents.

He has coached the Azerbaijan Youth chess team for the past 9 years.

References

External links
 

Chess grandmasters
Living people
Azerbaijani chess players
1979 births